Back Again! is the second album by Mr. Cheeks, released on March 18, 2003 through Universal Records.

Reception 

Back Again! was not as commercially successful as John P. Kelly, peaking at #75 on the Billboard 200 and #25 on the Top R&B/Hip-Hop Albums. The album's lead single "Crush on You" also failed to make an impact on the charts, only making it to No. 52 on the R&B/Hip-Hop singles chart.

Though it failed to reach the success of his previous effort, Back Again! did receive positive reviews. Rob Theakston of Allmusic gave the album four out of five stars and called it "easily his most accomplished record since his days in the Lost Boyz". He also called Crush on You "the album's masterpiece" and praised the cast of guest artists and Mr. Cheeks' versatility.

Track listing 
 "Supposed To"- 5:44 (featuring Floetry)
 "Reminisce 03'"- 3:49 (featuring Pete Rock & CL Smooth and Journalist)
 "The Hussle"- 4:49 (featuring M.O.P.)
 "Hands High"- 3:57 
 "I Apologize"- 4:35 (featuring Glenn Lewis)
 "Crush on You"- 3:57 (featuring Mario Winans)
 "Let's Get Wild"- 4:04 (featuring Floetry)
 "The Wire"- 5:04 
 "Back Again"- 3:19 
 "Pimpalicious"- 4:06 
 "Brighter"- 4:50 (featuring Alexander O'Neal)

Samples
Brighter
"Sunshine" by Alexander O'Neal
Reminisce 03'
"They Reminisce Over You (T.R.O.Y.)" by Pete Rock & C.L. Smooth
Supposed To
"Wild Flower" by Creative Source
The Hussle
"Musical Love" by Mary Jane Girls
Back Again
"Car Wash" by Rose Royce

Charts

Personnel 

 Kamel Abdo - Engineer 
 Wayne Allison - Engineer 
 Big Baby - Keyboards 
 Sandy Brummels - Creative Director 
 Eloise Bryan - A&R 
 Jim Caruana - Engineer, Mixing 
 James Cruz - Mastering 
 Charmaine Edwards - Associate Executive Producer, A&R 
 Nina Freeman - A&R 
 Rich Keller - Mixing 
 Christian Lantry - Photography
 
 Chuckie Madness - Programming, Producer 
 Tommy Martin - Guitar 
 Mr. Cheeks - Executive Producer 
 Monica Morrow - Stylist 
 Rob Paustian - Engineer, Mixing 
 Hernán Santiago - Mixing 
 Caleb Shreve - Engineer 
 Charles Suitt - Executive Producer, A&R 
 Annalee Valencia-Bruch - Art Direction, Design 
 Doug Wilson - Engineer, Mixing 
 Mario Winans - Multi Instruments, Producer

References 

2003 albums
Mr. Cheeks albums
Universal Records albums
Albums produced by Bink (record producer)
Albums produced by Sean Combs